Eastern Channel Pile Light, also known as the East Wedding Cake due to its shape, is an active pile lighthouse located at the Sydney Harbour, New South Wales, Australia, off Laings Point in the Vaucluse suburb of Sydney. It marks the eastern end of the Sow and Pigs Reef.

History 
Eastern Channel Pile Light was established in 1924 together with Western Channel Pile Light. It is constructed from concrete bottom (originally known as the "gas house") with a copper top and a wooden stakes skirt. It was originally gas powered (probably a carbide lamp), and was later converted to solar power.

Site operation 
The light is operated by the Sydney Ports Corporation and is scheduled for replacement. It is accessible only by boat, and is closed to the public.

See also 

 List of lighthouses in Australia

Notes

References 

  Listed as "Eastern Channel Beacon."

External links 

 

Lighthouses completed in 1924
Lighthouses in Sydney
1924 establishments in Australia